Soyombo is a Unicode block containing characters from the Soyombo alphabet, which is an abugida developed by the monk and scholar Zanabazar (1635–1723) in 1686 to write Mongolian. It can also be used to write Tibetan and Sanskrit. In addition, this block includes the Soyombo symbol on the flag of Mongolia.

Block
The Soyombo block was added to Unicode in June 2017 with version 10.0:

History
The following Unicode-related documents record the purpose and process of defining specific characters in the Soyombo block:

References 

Unicode blocks